Tobias Raschl (born 21 February 2000) is a German professional footballer who plays as a midfielder for 2. Bundesliga club Greuther Fürth.

Club career
Raschl had been a part of the youth teams of SG Unterrath, Borussia Mönchengladbach and Fortuna Düsseldorf before joining Borussia Dortmund in 2015. He started playing for the BVB youth teams from the 2015–16 season and was the stand-in captain of the under-19 side that won the Bundesliga U-19 championship in 2018–19.

Raschl scored goals against FC Barcelona in the UEFA Youth League in 2019–20, in both the home and away legs of the group stage fixtures. He had featured in the senior team friendlies against Seattle Sounders FC and FC Schweinberg in 2019, but he had to await an opportunity to make a senior team appearance until the end of the season. On 27 June 2020, Raschl played his first Bundesliga game in the last fixture of the 2019–20 season against 1899 Hoffenheim, when he substituted Leonardo Balerdi in the 65th minute as his team was trailing 4–0.

Raschl joined Greuther Fürth on 31 January 2022, the last day of the 2022 winter transfer window. He signed a contract until 2024.

Career statistics

Club

References

2000 births
Living people
Footballers from Düsseldorf
German footballers
Association football midfielders
Germany youth international footballers
Borussia Mönchengladbach players
Fortuna Düsseldorf players
Borussia Dortmund players
Borussia Dortmund II players
SpVgg Greuther Fürth players
Bundesliga players
3. Liga players
Regionalliga players